Pielgrzymowice  is a village in the administrative district of Gmina Wilków, within Namysłów County, Opole Voivodeship, in south-western Poland.

References

Pielgrzymowice